The Heritage Junior B Hockey League (HJHL) is a Junior B ice hockey league in Alberta, Canada, sanctioned by Hockey Canada. The HJHL was founded in 1987 and is made up of teams from southern and central Alberta. The HJHL is the largest Junior B league in the province, with 16 teams. The top two teams qualify for the Alberta Provincial Junior B Hockey Championship, whose winner had an option to compete in the Keystone Cup.

History 
HJHL teams have won the gold medal at the Keystone Cup twice. Red Deer Vipers were the first in 2006 defeating Campbell River Storm in the final. Blackfalds Wranglers won the gold medal in 2011.

The Lacombe Wranglers won the 2007 league championship over the Airdrie Thunder and Okotoks Bisons in a three team, round robin final. The Wranglers also captured the Alberta provincial title. The Wranglers chose not to participate in the Keystone Cup tournament due to scheduling conflicts.

During the 2011 HJHL finals Okotoks Bisons won the best-of-three series versus Blackfalds Wrangers 2–1, their eighth league title. Both teams advanced to the Junior B Provincials in Leduc. Blackfalds won the final 2–1 over the Beaumont Chiefs (CapJHL) to advance to the 2011 Keystone Cup in Sherwood Park. With a 4–1 record going into the final, Blackfalds defeated the host Sherwood Park Knights (CapJHL) 2–1 to win the Western Canadian crown.

Teams

League scoring records

Former teams 

Banff Academy Bears (2005–2017)
 Barrhead Jr. Elks
 Blackfalds Wranglers
 Claresholm Storm
 Drayton Valley Devils
 Hobbema Knight Hawks*
 Kainai Junior Braves  (20??-2022)
 Innisfail Blades
 Lacombe Wranglers
 Livingstone Rockmen
 Lomond Lakers (??-2022)
 Maskwacis Attack
 Rimbey Rock
 Rimbey West Stars
 Siksika Ice
 Southern Express

Nb: * Hobbema is now known as Maskwacis

Champions

Bold text denote teams that won the Alberta provincial title.

See also
 List of ice hockey teams in Alberta

References

External links
Heritage Junior Hockey League
Airdrie Thunder
Coaldale Copperheads
Cochrane Generals
High River Flyers
Medicine Hat Cubs
Okotoks Bisons
Ponoka Stampeders
Red Deer Vipers
Rocky Rams
Three Hills Thrashers

Ice hockey leagues in Alberta
B